Andy Roddick defeated Juan Carlos Ferrero in the final, 6–3, 7–6(7–2), 6–3 to win the men's singles tennis title at the 2003 US Open. It was his first and only major title. Roddick remains the most recent American to win the US Open men's singles title, as well as any major men's singles title. Roddick saved a match point en route to the title, in the semifinals against David Nalbandian.

Pete Sampras was the reigning champion, but he retired from professional tennis in August 2003.

This was the first US Open where future four-time champion Rafael Nadal appeared in the main draw, as well as the first major main draw appearance for future world No. 4 and Wimbledon finalist Tomáš Berdych. It was also the final major appearance for former major champions Michael Chang and Yevgeny Kafelnikov.

Seeds

Qualifying

Draw

Finals

Top half

Section 1

Section 2

Section 3

Section 4

Bottom half

Section 5

Section 6

Section 7

Section 8

External links
 Association of Tennis Professionals (ATP) – 2003 US Open Men's Singles draw
2003 US Open – Men's draws and results at the International Tennis Federation

Men's Singles
US Open (tennis) by year – Men's singles